Maverick station (known as Maverick Square) is a rapid transit station in Boston, Massachusetts. It serves the MBTA's Blue Line and is located at Maverick Square in East Boston. It is the easternmost underground station on the Blue Line and a transfer point to various buses. A center island platform provides access to the surface in the middle of Maverick Square. In the station, a track map lined with light bulbs shows the position of the trains on the Blue Line between Bowdoin and Orient Heights. It was one of the last stations to be converted to 6-car train service as part of the MBTA's Blue Line Renovation Project.

History

When the East Boston Tunnel originally opened on December 30, 1904, it was a streetcar tunnel with a portal at Maverick, known as Maverick portal or the Maverick incline. There was no station at Maverick; streetcars simply left the portal and continued north on Meridian Street or southeast on Maverick Street.

On April 18–21, 1924, the tunnel was converted to rapid transit and Maverick station opened, with the streetcar loop between the rapid transit platforms. The streetcar loop and portal have since been closed, with parts of the incline now used for pedestrian access. The station has an extra-wide platform as a result of filling in the former streetcar tracks. The abandoned streetcar loop west of the station remains extant.

The MBTA began design work of a renovation of the station in 1998. A $30.8 million construction contract, which also included ventilation work in the East Boston Tunnel, was awarded on May 5, 2005. Construction began with a groundbreaking ceremony on October 4, 2005. The work included extension of the platforms for six-car trains, replacement of the Maverick Square headhouse, addition of a new headhouse on Lewis Mall, and the creation of a dedicated busway in Maverick Square. Both headhouses included an elevator to make the station fully accessible. The Lewis Mall headhouse opened on September 22, 2007, allowing the old Maverick Square headhouse to be demolished that November. The renovation was completed in 2009. The final cost was $56.3 million, which included $12.4 million in change orders – of which $8.9 million was due to design errors by the MBTA.

Bus connections

The station is a terminal for five MBTA bus local routes:
: Market Basket–Maverick station
: –Maverick station via Revere Street
: Wonderland station–Maverick station via Beach Street
: Orient Heights station–Jeffries Point
: Wood Island Station–Maverick station

References

External links

MBTA – Maverick
Google Maps Street View: Maverick Square headhouse, Lewis Mall headhouse

Blue Line (MBTA) stations
East Boston
Railway stations located underground in Boston
Railway stations in the United States opened in 1904